The Northern Rietzschke is a river of Saxony, Germany.

See also
List of rivers of Saxony

Rivers of Saxony
2Northern Rietzschke
Rivers of Germany